Tetraria bromoides is a sedge, which is native to the Cape Provinces in  Southern Africa.

Taxonomy
Tetraria bromoides was first described as Schoenus bromoides by Lamarck in 1791. In 1927, this was revised to Tetraria bromoides by Hans Pfeiffer.

References

External links
Ville de Geneve: Conservatoire et Jardin botaniques Tetraria bromoides
JSTOR: specimens of Tetraria bromoides
 CYPERACEAE interactive identification keys @ LSU Herbarium

bromoides
Plants described in 1927
Taxa named by Hans Heinrich Pfeiffer
Flora of the Cape Provinces